The 1963 Arkansas Razorbacks football team represented the University of Arkansas in the Southwest Conference (SWC) during the 1963 NCAA University Division football season. In their sixth year under head coach Frank Broyles, the Razorbacks compiled a 5–5 record (3–4 against SWC opponents), finished in fourth place in the SWC, and outscored all opponents by a combined total of 179 to 96.

Ken Hatfield led the nation in punt return yards, gaining 350 on 21 returns. Razorback Ronnie Caveness set a school record in the Texas game with 29 tackles. The NCAA record is 30, set in 2001.

Schedule

References

Arkansas
Arkansas Razorbacks football seasons
Arkansas Razorbacks football